The Inner London Education Authority election, 1986 was held on 8 May in order to elect 58 members to the Inner London Education Authority (ILEA). Constituents of the 29 seats of inner London (at the time) elected two members each.

This was the first and last direct election to the ILEA, which was abolished in 1990 following the Education Reform Act 1988. Previously, members had been co-opted from the Greater London Council (GLC).

Background 

The ILEA had been established in 1965 to assume the educational responsibilities of the former London County Council. It was originally made up of the members of the GLC who represented Inner London areas, together with one representative from each of the inner London boroughs.

The abolition of the GLC led to an attempt to abolish the ILEA and devolve its powers to the inner London boroughs. The boroughs were judged not ready to handle education services, so the ILEA was retained. An initial proposal was to replace it with a joint board nominated by the boroughs. Ultimately, it was decided to hold direct elections.

Results 

Electorate: 1,727,139. Turnout: 44.0%.

Members

References

Inner London Education Authority election
1986 English local elections
Elections in London
1986 in education
May 1986 events in the United Kingdom